Kim Chuan Depot  is a train depot for the Mass Rapid Transit system in Singapore. The depot is constructed fully underground and provides maintenance, stabling and operational facilities for the Circle line. It is located in Hougang, along Upper Paya Lebar Road, and is accessible via Kim Chuan Road.

It used to be the first depot in Singapore to serve two independently operated MRT lines, until the adjacent Tai Seng Facility Building, became operational with the revenue operation of the Downtown line Stage 3 on 21 October 2017.

History
To facilitate the construction of the depot, part of the Kim Chuan Village was acquired in September 2000 for the construction of the depot and the road viaduct. The Kim Chuan Road was permanently closed from Hougang Avenue 3 to Kim Chuan Drive on 27 June 2002. On 25 October 2002, part of the Hougang Avenue 3 was realigned and on 25 November 2002, part of the Kim Chuan Road was closed.

The project cost S$297 million to construct and 2.1 million cubic metres of soil had to be excavated for its construction. Touted as the world's biggest underground depot, it officially opened on 4 March 2009, employing 300 staff members.

The depot was used for the temporary storage and light maintenance of rolling stock for the Downtown line, before the completion of the Tai Seng Facility Building. It also provided a route in which Downtown line trains can be towed from the depot to its operational line via the Circle line tracks. Once the main depot, Gali Batu Depot was completed with stage 2 of the Downtown line, Kim Chuan Depot simply provides a route for newly delivered Downtown line trains to be transferred in to the Tai Seng Facility Building.

Design 
The depot has a capacity to stable 70 trains and covers an area of more than 100,000 square metres, reaching a depth of 24 metres at some points. Specifically, the main depot floor is 800 metres in length, 160 metres in width and 23 metres in height. The facility contains the main operation control centre for the Circle line, maintenance facility, stabling areas, and ancillary facilities such as train wash and workshops. It also houses an automatic storage and retrieval system, a warehouse that stores spare parts for the rolling stocks and other equipments. The depot is connected to the adjacent Tai Seng Facility Building on the east side of the facility and is operated in tandem with the Tai Seng Maintenance Facility.

The depot is accessible via an administration building along Kim Chuan Road, containing offices, a warehouse, a canteen and a 66 kilovolt substation is located above the depot. The remaining 3 hectares of land left empty will be used for light industrial use with buildings on it up to 9 storeys high. 

The depot is located between Tai Seng station and Bartley station on the Circle line and has 4 reception tracks: 2 tracks clockwise-bound towards Tai Seng station and 2 tracks anticlockwise-bound towards Bartley station.

Extension

On 29 October 2015, LTA announced the extension of Kim Chuan depot in tandem with the Circle line stage 6 extension. The extension called for the depot to be expanded underground to almost double its land area and stabling capacity from 70 to 133 trains. The integrated depot will also house 550 buses on the plot of land above the underground train depot.

The Contract 821A for the construction of Kim Chuan Depot extension and its associated facilities was awarded to Woh Hup (Private) Limited at a sum of S$1.21 billion in September 2017. Construction began in 2018, with completion in 2025.

The extension will be located along the northern perimeter of the Bartley Road East viaduct, north of the existing depot which is along the southern perimeter of the Bartley Road East viaduct.

References

External links
 LTA page on Kim Chuan Depot
 More Information on Kim Chuan Depot (Archived in The Internet Archive)
 News article about Kim Chuan Depot from Channel News Asia
 PDF Document – LTA Technical Visit to Circle Line Underground Depot/Control Centre (Kim Chuan Depot)
 Government C830 Project Office – Kim Chuan Depot 
 Government CIRCLE LINE CONTRACT C821/C822 DIVISION (Kim Chuan Depot) 
 Government Speech/Press Release from Kim Chuan Depot

2009 establishments in Singapore
Mass Rapid Transit (Singapore) depots